Mohsin Uddin Ahmed was a Brigadier General of the Bangladesh Army and recipient of Bir Bikrom, the third highest gallantry award of Bangladesh, for his actions during the Bangladesh Liberation War. He was the senior most official of Bangladesh Army executed for the assassination of Ziaur Rahman.

Early life 
Ahmed was born on 24 December 1939 in Sreenagar Upazila, Bikrampur District, East Bengal, British India. His father was Mohiuddin Ahmed and mother was Begum Nurunnahar. He was married to Hosne Ara. While doing his masters in Geography, he joined the Pakistan Army in 1963.

Career 
Ahmed received his commission in the 3rd East Bengal Regiment of Pakistan Army in 1964.

On 26 March 1971, Ahmed the Adjutant of the East Bengal Center in Chittagong District when Operation Searchlight was launched by Pakistan Army. He deserted the army and fought for Bangladesh in the Bangladesh Liberation War. He served in the 3rd East Bengal of the Z forces commanded by Major Ziaur Rahman. He commanded a company during the war based in India. He fought a number of skirmishes during the war most notably at Tengratila in Sunamganj District. He received Bir Bikrom for his role in the war.

Death 
Ahmed was serving as the commander of the 69th Infantry Brigade in Chittagong when assassination of Ziaur Rahman, president of Bangladesh, took place in Chittagong on 30 May 1981. He was arrested on 2 June, tried in a court martial by Major General Abdur Rahman, and executed on 28 September 1981 in Rajshahi Jail. The prosecutors at the trial were Colonel A.M.S.A. Amin, Lieutenant Colonel Abu Nayeem Amin Ahmed, and Brigadier General Nazirul Aziz Chishti. His defence team was composed of Brigadier General M. Anwar Hossain, Colonel Mohammad Ainuddin, and Lieutenant Colonel Syed Muhammad Ibrahim. The trial last 17 days after which 12 officers were hanged. He was buried in Banani graveyard.

References 

1939 births
1981 deaths
Bangladesh Army generals
Burials at Banani Graveyard
People convicted of murder by Bangladesh
Recipients of the Bir Bikrom
People executed by Bangladesh by hanging
Mukti Bahini personnel